Petr Paucek is a Czech-born biophysicist and biomedical researcher and an associate professor of biology at Portland State University.

Early life and education
Paucek attended the Academy of Science at Prague, where he obtained doctorates in biophysics and physiology, and later trained at the Medical College of Ohio (subsequently renamed The University of Toledo Health Science Campus) and the Oregon Health & Science University. He relocated from Oregon to Maine in 2005 to conduct research at the Thomas M. Teague Biotechnology Center in Fairfield.

Career
He has co-authored a number of frequently-cited articles in Circulation Research, the Journal of Biological Chemistry, and the American Journal of Physiology.

References

External links 
Comprehensive CV
Personal website

American biophysicists
American people of Czech descent
Czechoslovak emigrants to the United States
Living people
Oregon Health & Science University alumni
Portland State University faculty
University of Toledo faculty
Year of birth missing (living people)